Mat Whitecross (born 21 September 1977) is an English film director, editor and screenwriter. He began his career working for filmmaker Michael Winterbottom and producer Andrew Eaton at Revolution Films, being also known for directing The Road to Guantánamo, Ian Dury biopic Sex & Drugs & Rock & Roll, as well as music documentaries Oasis: Supersonic and Coldplay: A Head Full of Dreams. Whitecross has also directed music videos for Coldplay, Take That and The Rolling Stones, being a long-time collaborator of the former band.

Life and career 
Whitecross was born and raised on Oxford. His parents were political refugees who were imprisoned in Argentina during the country’s Dirty War. He takes inspiration from the place where he was raised and from his parents' friends, many of whom are South American immigrants who fled tortures and prison.
He began his career working for filmmaker Michael Winterbottom and producer Andrew Eaton at Revolution Films as a runner on the film 24 Hour Party People. Within a few months of starting at Revolution Films, they gave him the chance of shooting and editing for them. 
His directorial debut The Road to Guantanamo started as a conversation with Winterbottom about the Tipton Three whilst on the shoot for the film 9 Songs. They both agreed that the story was fascinating and worth of a film but due to other commitments, Winterbottom was unable to begin research and preparation, suggesting that Mat should start the process. Whitecross and Winterbottom would go on to co-direct and co-write the film that featured Riz Ahmed in his debut acting role. The Road to Guantánamo won the Silver Bear for Best Director at the 56th Berlin International Film Festival and Independent Spirit Award for Best Documentary Feature.

Filmography

Film

Television

Music videos

Awards and nominations

Notes

References

External links

1977 births
Living people
English film directors
English music video directors
English screenwriters
English male screenwriters
Silver Bear for Best Director recipients